Tim Souster (29 January 1943 – 1 March 1994) was a British composer and writer on music, best known for his electronic music output.

Biography

Education
Born Timothy Andrew James Souster in Bletchley, Buckinghamshire, Souster was educated at Bedford Modern School (from 1952 through 1961) and New College, Oxford (from 1961 through 1964). His teachers included Bernard Rose, Sir David Lumsden and Egon Wellesz. In 1964, he attended summer courses at Darmstadt taught by Karlheinz Stockhausen, and took composition lessons with Richard Rodney Bennett the following year.

Before the end of 1965, Souster was a producer with the BBC Third Programme, and put on many performances of contemporary music by composers such as Boulez, Berio, Barraqué, Cardew, Feldman, Henze and Stockhausen. After leaving the BBC in 1967, he began to devote more time to composing and songwriting.

Foray into electronic music 
In the late 1960s Souster began experimenting with electronics. His first acknowledged composition involving electronic techniques was Titus Groan Music (1969) for wind quintet, ring modulator, amplifiers and tape. In August of the same year he moved to King's College, Cambridge and formed a live-electronic group with Roger Smalley, Andrew Powell and Robin Thompson called Intermodulation. As well as compositions by Souster and Smalley, the group performed contemporary music by Cardew, Riley, Rzewski, Stockhausen and Wolff.

Later years 
In 1971, Souster became a teaching assistant to Stockhausen in Cologne, and in 1973 he moved to Berlin where he remained for two years. In 1975 Souster returned to England to take up a research fellowship at Keele University. He remained in England for the rest of his life, except for a six-month stint in California in 1978.

He died after a brief, sudden illness on 1 March 1994.

Compositions
His concert pieces included Triple Music II for three orchestras, given at the Proms in 1970 and revised in 1974, Song of an Average City for small orchestra and tape, conducted by Pierre Boulez at the Roundhouse in 1974, and a Trumpet Concerto (1988) for John Wallace and the BBC National Orchestra of Wales.

In the 1980s and 1990s Souster wrote music for film and television, including music for The Hitchhikers Guide to the Galaxy, for which he also arranged the main theme, a version of "Journey of the Sorcerer" by The Eagles. His music for the BBC drama miniseries The Green Man, adapted from the Kingsley Amis novel and starring Albert Finney, won the BAFTA award for best TV music of 1990. During this period, Souster composed a large amount of concert music.

He wrote a number of important works for brass and electronics including Equalisation (1980) for Equale Brass and Echoes (1990). His last completed work was La marche (1993), a brass quintet.

Writings 
In addition to his activities as a composer and performer, Souster published a large number of articles about music .

References

Cited sources

Further reading 
 Anon. 1994. "Tim Souster". The Times (18 March).
 Doran, Mark. 2002. "Cambridge, Anglia Polytechnic University: Tim Souster's 'World Music'". Tempo, no. 219 (January): 41–42.
 Nyman, Michael. 1970. "Tim Souster's Night Out at the Proms". Tempo, no. 94 (Autumn): 20–24.
 Thompson, Robin. 1969. "Tim Souster's Titus Groan Music". Tempo, no. 89 (Summer): 21–22.
 Wallace, John. 1994. "Obituary: Tim Souster: An Eclectic Experimenter". The Guardian (5 March): 30.

External links 
 Official Tim Souster Web Site
 Tim Souster Published Works at Composers Edition
 The Tim Souster Archive
 

1943 births
1994 deaths
People educated at Bedford Modern School
20th-century classical composers
English classical composers
Alumni of New College, Oxford
People from Bletchley
Pupils of Karlheinz Stockhausen
20th-century English composers
English male classical composers
20th-century British male musicians
BBC Radio 3
BBC radio producers